Denisse Alejandra Malebrán Soto, known as Denisse Malebrán (28 May 1976, Santiago), is a Chilean singer, songwriter and vocalist. She is member of the synthpop band, Saiko. She was a contestant on Dancing with the Stars.

Studio albums
Maleza (2007)
Pagana (2009)
Mi Caravana (2011)

References

1976 births
People from Santiago
21st-century Chilean women singers
Chilean songwriters
Living people